Satanicpornocultshop is a Japanese experimental music group making assemblage-style compositions that incorporate a variety of musical styles and techniques. The group draws heavily on hip hop and electronic influences to create "bricolage hip hop" inspired by the theories of Claude Lévi-Strauss. Beginning in the early 2010s, the group began focusing on Juke and Footwork music, influenced by the Chicago scene.

History

The group released their first album in 1998, Nirvana or Lunch?, and in 2006 won Digital Music Honorary Mention from Prix Ars Electronica. In this same year they won a Qwartz Award and performed in “Le Japon À La Cité de la Musique, Expériences limites” at Cité de la Musique, Paris. In 2007, they performed at Experimentaclub'07, an experimental music festival in Madrid.
In 2010, the group signed with Some Bizzare Records and released the album “Arkhaiomelisidonophunikheratos”. The founding member of the group, Ugh Yoing, passed away on August 8, 2018.

Members
Current members
 Vinylman - turntables (2001-present)
 esreko - electronics, pipe (2002-2013, 2018-present)
 Frosen Pine - guitar, MC (2006-present)
 Ikeguchi - video (2013-present)
 waruugaki - vocals (2018-present)

Former members
 Alan Folkroe - electronics, vocals, guitar (1997-2001)
 Along with Dj*Gammehuche, likely an alias used by Ugh Yoing.
 Ugh Yoing - turntables, MC, vocals, guitar (1997-2018)
 Meu-Meu - vocals, video, jew's harp (2002-2005)
 Lisa Tani - vocals (2003-2010)
 Liftman - synth, keyboards (2006-2010)
 Akumadaikon - electronics (2010-2022)

Timeline

Discography

Studio albums
Nirvana or Lunch? (CD) nunulaxnulan 1998
Baltimore 1972 (CD) nunulaxnulan 1999
Belle Excentrique (CD) nunulaxnulan 2000
Sirocco (CDR) Inprinting North Release 2002
Ugh Yoing (CD) nunulaxnulan 2002
Piss'en Ass (CDR) neji 2003
Anorexia Gas Balloon (CD) Sonore 2003
Orochi Under the Straight Edge Leaves (CD) Vivo Records 2005
Zap Meemees (CD) Sonore 2005
Takusan No Ohanasan (CD) Vivo Records 2008
Arkhaiomelisidonophunikheratos (CD) Some Bizzare 2010
Catholic Sunspot Apron (CD) nunulaxnulan 2010
an†i-Buddhist♀ (digital) neji 2012
Battle Creek Brawl (digital) neji 2012
Picaresque (digital) neji 2013
Maiden Voyage (digital) neji 2013
frEEwheelin' (digital) neji 2014
AtoZ!!!2 (2CD) neji 2014
The Shipboard Gardener: music for Listening Room at UNYAZI Festival 2014 (digital) neji 2014
Rob A Grave Vol.1 (digital) neji 2014
Rob A Grave Vol.2 (digital) nejin 2014
El Día Que Me Quieras (digital) neji 2015 
Faucet Zero (digital) neji 2015
The Ship With No Cargo: Variations Of 'The Shipboard Gardener' For Voice And Words (digital) neji 2015 
Their Satanic Majesties Sweet Disco Request (digital) neji 2015
Mystic Island (digital) neji 2016
Satapo's Pancake Repair (digital) neji 2016
†he R∉v∉rs∉ of Cre⇒p!ng §h∂doωdrum $cr∉∂m "F!sh F!sh F!sh!!!" (digital) neji 2017
Gundensan (digital) neji 2017
Ebony/Ivory (digital) neji 2017
The Rise And Fall Of... (digital) Zona Musica 2018
OYASUMI (digital) KOOL SWITCH WORKS 2020
Scream Block (vinyl) Cult Trax 2021

Singles & EPs
Univers (CDR) neji 2002
Piss Off EP (CDR, EP) Chakra Smile 2003
Jag Meemees EP (CDR, EP) [ph]uturistic-beatz 2004
Music For Meu-Meu's Puppet Show (CDR) neji 2005
.Aiff Skull EP (CD, EP) Vivo Records 2006
Pope EP (CDR, EP) Vaatican Records 2006
Custom Drum Destroyer EP (CD, EP) disco_r.dance 2007
Closer EP (CDR, EP) neji 2009
Tennnojizoo EP (CDR, EP) neji 2010
Kesalan Patharan EP (digital, EP) UpItUp! 2010
Nucler EP (digital, EP) neji 2011
Hellasick EP (digital, EP) bootytune 2011
Yudamen EP (digital, EP) neji 2012
Sunshine Baby Remixes (CDR, Maxi-Single) Booty Tune 2013
frEE EP (digital, EP) JUKE underground 2014
Nejirinbou (digital, EP) Dynasty Shit 2014
Snack EP (digital, EP) neji 2015
Bloodless (digital, EP) Sidewayz Funk Records 2015
Kinzoku Bat (digital, EP) KnightWerk Records 2017
陰毛バーニングマン666ep (digital, EP) smoke_rec 2018
Delicious Beats 4 Sale! Vol.1 (digital, EP) KOOL SWITCH WORKS 2018
New Fuck E.P. (digital, EP) KOOL SWITCH WORKS 2019
 #RIPugh (Live20181222_extra2020) (digital, Single) anecdote 2020
W Debby (digital, EP) neji 2021

Compilations
 The Wire Tapper 10 (CD) The Wire (magazine) 2003
 Unacknowledged Pop-Song Collection Vol.666(CD) XerXes 2003 
 160OR80 (2CD＋DVD) Thailand Bookstore 2013
AtoZ!!!!!AlphabetBusterS!!!!! (2CD) nunulaxnulan 2013
AtoZ!!!2 (2CD) nunulaxnulan 2014
 Atomic Bomb Compilation Vol. 2 (digital) Atomic Bomb Compilation 2014 
AtoZ3 Around the World in a Day (2CD) nunulaxnulan 2017

See also
List of breakcore artists
Some Bizzare Records discography
Qwartz Electronic Music Awards

Footnotes

External links 
 Satanicpornocultshop bandcamp

Experimental musical groups
Japanese post-punk music groups
Musical groups established in 1997
Japanese electronic music groups
Some Bizzare Records artists